KDKS-FM  is a radio station licensed to Blanchard in Caddo Parish in northwestern Louisiana and broadcasting to Shreveport with an Urban Adult Contemporary musical format.  Broadcasting on 102.1 FM, it is owned by Alpha Media LLC, through licensee Alpha Media Licensee LLC.  Its studios are located just north of downtown Shreveport, and the transmitter is in Blanchard.

Around the late 1990s to early 2000s KDKS, originally called "HOT 102," was launched with an Urban Contemporary format originally as one of the first competitors to challenge KMJJ, and was launched alongside sister station KBTT (then a Rhythmic).  At first it was an Urban AC station until it chose to aim at a more broader 18–49 audience by adding hip hop to the playlist a little later on.  When KVMA-FM was launched in 2004, KDKS decided to turn its format back around to Urban AC and instead take its newcoming Urban rival on, while the owners shifted KBTT from Rhythmic to Mainstream Urban and take on KMJJ from that point.  Originally the home of Tom Joyner (now on KVMA), KDKS is now the syndicated home of Steve Harvey in the mornings.

State Representative Roy A. Burrell of Shreveport is a former talk show host on KDKS.

References

External links 

 

Radio stations in Louisiana
Urban adult contemporary radio stations in the United States
Alpha Media radio stations